Lepturus calcareus is a species of grass in the family Poaceae. It is found only in Yemen. Its natural habitats are subtropical or tropical dry forests and subtropical or tropical dry shrubland.

References

calcareus
Endemic flora of Socotra
Data deficient plants
Taxonomy articles created by Polbot